Andrea Geraldine Ramírez Zollino (born 16 September 1981) is a Mexican politician from the Ecologist Green Party of Mexico. In 2009 he served as Deputy of the LX Legislature of the Mexican Congress representing the Federal District.

References

1981 births
Living people
Politicians from Mexico City
Women members of the Chamber of Deputies (Mexico)
Ecologist Green Party of Mexico politicians
21st-century Mexican politicians
21st-century Mexican women politicians
Deputies of the LX Legislature of Mexico
Members of the Chamber of Deputies (Mexico) for Mexico City